"The Mad Gardener's Song" is a poem by Lewis Carroll that appears in his book Sylvie and Bruno (1889, 1893).

Structure
The poem consists of nine stanzas, each of six lines. Each stanza contains alternating lines of iambic tetrameter and iambic trimeter, with the trimetric lines rhyming with each other. Each verse is scattered around the novel Sylvie and Bruno, with eight verses in the first volume and one in the second, Sylvie and Bruno Concluded.

Text

Reception
In his Bright Dreams Journal, Gary R. Hess called the poem "the only bright part of the book."

In The Aesthetics of Children's Poetry: A Study of Children's Verse in English, Katherine Wakely-Mulroney described the poem as "an incantatory, cyclical poem which reflects and even prefigures aspects of the prose narrative."

Adaptations

"The Mad Gardener's Song" featured on the BBC show Play School in 1981.

Composer Stuart Findlay set "The Mad Gardener's Song" to viola, clarinet and piano in 1994.

Notes

External links
SYLVIE and BRUNO on the Gutenberg Project

Poetry by Lewis Carroll
1889 poems
1893 poems
Nonsense poetry